Mohabbat Zindagi Hai may refer to:

 Mohabbat Zindagi Hai (1966 film), a 1966 Hindi film
 Mohabbat Zindagi Hai (1975 film), a 1975 Pakistani Urdu film
 "Mohabbat Zindagi Hai" (song), a popular song written for the Pakistani film Tum Salamat Raho